Pipiza macrofemoralis (Curran, 1921), the large-legged pithead, is a fairly common species of syrphid fly observed in many locations across Northern North America.. Hoverflies can remain nearly motionless in flight. The adults are also known as flower flies for they are commonly found on flowers from which they get both energy-giving nectar and protein-rich pollen. Larvae, when known, are aphid predators.

References

Diptera of North America
Hoverflies of North America
Pipizinae
Insects described in 1921
Taxa named by Charles Howard Curran